Nina Sedano is a German woman who has visited every country on earth. She visited every country by 2013 and then she began to write a book about her travels.

Nina Sedano wrote a book, Laendersammlerin, documenting her travels to every sovereign nation in the world. Laendersammlerin was a Spiegel bestseller in Germany. It was published in 2014 by Eden Books.

She followed with another book, Fernweh in Herzen: Die Ländersammlerin unterwegs zu neuen Abenteuern. Die meistgereiste Frau Deutschlands erzählt, that was published in 2019.

She has stated that she has documented proof of her travel to every country.

References

21st-century German women writers
Living people
Year of birth missing (living people)
Place of birth missing (living people)
German travel writers